The 1976 Japan Series was the 27th edition of Nippon Professional Baseball's postseason championship series. It matched the Central League champion Yomiuri Giants against the Pacific League champion Hankyu Braves. The Braves defeated the Giants in seven games to win their second consecutive Japan Series championship.

Summary

See also
1976 World Series

References

Japan Series
Orix Buffaloes
Yomiuri Giants
Japan Series
Japan Series
Japan Series
Japan Series
Japan Series